Belle Davis (April 28, 1874 – 1938) was an American choreographer, dancer and singer who became famous in the UK before World War I. She was in a group called the "Octoroons" in America and moved to Britain in 1902 where she toured accompanied by young African American boys. She has been said to be the first black woman to make a recording.

Life 
Davis was born in 1874 in Chicago (although some say New Orleans). She was light skinned and she was encourage to darken her skin so that she would fit the stereotype of a black entertainer. In 1891 she joined the new burlesque "Creole Show" at Sam T. Jack's Opera House, and toured on Jack's circuit.

She was in a group called the "Octoroons" in America before she moved to Britain in 1901. She was said to be licensed by the US government to bring child performers to Britain. Some were known to exploit orphans in this way but Davis was noted for her role as their guardian.

Davis was appearing at venues on the Empire Theatre circuit later that year. She was a soprano and her singing was of melodies and her appearance was stately and she had handsome promotional pictures. She appeared with two, sometimes four, African American boys who would add dances and comedy to her songs. Two of the boys, both then under ten years old, Irving "Sneeze" Williams and Sonny Jones went on to have their own careers as musicians.

On 24 January 1902 she made a recording of "The Honeysuckle and the Bee" under the name of "Belle Davis and her Piccaninnies". They were back the following month to record "The Rainbow Coon". This is the first known recording by a Black woman. 

Davis would tour with this act visiting many of the major cities in England. In 1906 she and her three dancers were interviewed with the comment that one was like "the nigger-boy in children's picture books". The following year they were in Germany where two films were made and they survived.

In 1925, she was the choreographer at the "Casino de Paris" Music Hall. Here she recruited performers and arranged the dancing until 1929. During this time she returned to London to her house in Holborn where she recruited five dancers including the tap dancer Josie Woods. They were called the "Magnolia Blossoms" and they were taken back to Paris.

Davis left Europe and returned to America in 1938. No further details are known.

References

Sources
 

1874 births
1938 deaths
People from Chicago
American female dancers
19th-century American women singers
20th-century American women singers
American women choreographers
American choreographers
Burlesque performers
20th-century American singers
19th-century American singers
19th-century American dancers
20th-century American dancers
American expatriates in the United Kingdom